Urals Optical-Mechanical Plant is a company based in Yekaterinburg, Russia. It is part of the Shvabe Holding (Rostec group).

The Urals Optical-Mechanical Plant Production Association is one of Russia's leading optical enterprises, producing optical systems for military aircraft. Products include bomb aiming systems, laser distance measuring systems, and optical laser systems for the MiG-29 Fulcrum, Su-27 Flanker, and Tu-160 Blackjack military aircraft.

References

External links
 Official website

Manufacturing companies based in Yekaterinburg
Shvabe Holding
Defence companies of the Soviet Union
Ministry of the Defense Industry (Soviet Union)
Aircraft component manufacturers of the Soviet Union